The Joseon Navy (Hanja: 朝鮮水軍) was the navy of the Korean dynasty of Joseon. While originally commissioned to protect merchant vessels and coastal towns from Japanese pirate raids, the Joseon navy is best known for defeating the Japanese naval forces during the Imjin War and is often credited with halting the Japanese invasion campaign and saving the dynasty from conquest.

History

Throughout Korea's naval history, rough waters around Korea's coast usually change tides and currents. Korean shipbuilding tradition centered on creating simple but structurally sound vessels that emphasized strength and power rather than speed. The Joseon Navy utilized warships from the Goryeo Dynasty to defend against the Wokou Piracy. In the 15th century, under the decree of King Sejong, more powerful cannons were developed and tested. The cannons on battleships proved to be a great success during actions against Japanese pirate ships.

In 1419, King Sejong sent Yi Jongmu to raid the Japanese on Tsushima Island in the Oei Invasion as a response to Japanese Wokou raids on Korean coastal cities. Yi took 227 Korean ships and approximately 17,000 soldiers, landed, attacked, and plundered Japanese pirate settlements on Tsushima Island. The So clan, the ruling family of Tsushima, requested negotiations. In the diplomatic exchanges that followed, Korea permitted the So clan to continue trade with Korean coastal harbors under the condition that they suppress the activities of Japanese pirates.

During the Joseon Dynasty, the navy and maritime operations fell into disuse, while fishing vessels continued to operate and prosper. The entire military was ignored and weakened because of the relative peace during the Joseon dynasty. Also, with the policy of Korean kings that emphasized agriculture and Confucian ideals, the Korean navy, along with the rest of the Korean military, weakened steadily. However, Korea eventually developed strong wooden ships called  that made up the backbone of the Joseon navy.  and the Korean navy were most widely used during the Japanese invasions of Korea (1592-1598), particularly under the leadership of Admiral Yi Sun-sin. Admiral Yi also developed the turtle ship, based upon an older design. The Kobukson, or Turtle Ship, was the world's first armor-plated warship. 

By the end of the 19th century, the Joseon Navy had no significant naval force other than coast defense fortresses. In March 1893, the Korean Imperial Naval Academy (통제영학당,統制營學堂) was established. The academy produces approximately 160 officers before its close during and after the First Sino-Japanese War.

Organization
The command system of the naval forces was that one or two provincial commanders from each province commanded a provincial naval base, and each coastal county and city had a naval commander. The majority of the Joseon Navy was stationed in Gyeongsang, Jeolla, and Chungcheong provinces. After several reorganizations concerning the naval command of the military magistrates during the reign of King Sejong, he established the naval commander system, under which the naval commanders were placed.

During the reign of King Seongjong in 1475, out of 148,849 service members, 48,800 were sailors, and 72,109 were soldiers turned marines. The naval forces not only recruited people from the coast but also on land. Officers received preferential treatment over the officers on land, and they served 3-6 months a year. When people joined the navy, they carried the military load on their backs and worked on board ships. They mobilized for miscellaneous work such as defending coastal fortresses. They even harvested salt during their services. Much of the tribute from seaside regions was seafood. Salt was popular across the nation. They produce salt and capture seafood during their military service. Therefore, the role of the navy was twice as heavy as the institutional burden compared to the army.

In the Mid-Joseon period, the navy had poor working conditions, and they failed to defend themselves from confrontations. Warships back then were extremely vulnerable to wind and waves. Sailors and marines received the worst treatment in the military that they were exposed to various diseases and contagions to the point that their members became deserters. Wealthy naval officers hired men to take over their military service and were exempted from military service by receiving clothes from the naval forces. Commanders, marines, and sailors were often the subject of power-based irregularities and mistreatment, and more and more soldiers deserted their posts. Such circumstances had continued for over 100 years. 

As unknown people and criminals filled the naval forces, the naval forces transformed. The government came up with an extreme measure of making naval forces hereditary to maintain a certain amount of military power, but it made people avoid the service even more. The state-regulated taxation offered the benefits of protection and cared for the rich and the poor to recruit them into the naval forces. Seongjong conferred an honorary title to a naval officer, exempting him from essential duties and considering various benefits, such as riches. During the late Joseon Dynasty, King Sukjong implemented reforms to naval service to combat recruitment shortages and strengthen the navy.

Admiral Yi Sun-sin prepared for the Japanese invasion of Korea in 1592. He and his subordinate Jeong Woon reformed the navy by reducing the hours of fatigue duty or banning nighttime fatigue duty. When Admiral Yi Sun-sin inspected troops and pointed to defects, commanders explained their struggles that people were tired and there were not enough supplies, capacity, and lacked military power.

Border Defense Council of Joseon
The Border Defense Council of Joseon was a supreme administrative organ established by the central government after the Disturbance of the Three Ports. It allowed the higher military officers, the Jibyeonsa Jaesang (in Hangul: 지변사재상, in Hanja: 知邊司宰相), to participate in the process of establishing security maneuvers to meticulously keep a keen eye on the issues of the border. Accordingly, the council applied naval security measures to Gyeongsang province and extended them to Jeolla and to the rest of the southern provinces.

National Defense System

Jingwan System
The Jingwan System was a provincial defense system that dates back to the Goryeo Dynasty, building fortresses in strategically important places. Still, it leaves some parts of the nations open to invasion, and if one falls, it will be catastrophic in any war. In 1457 A.D, King Sejo reshuffled the defense system to secure as many defensive fortresses as possible to enhance the defensive depth. It comprises a Jujin, the main fortress commanded by a Jeoldosa, a provincial naval commander who takes a regional coastal defense and orders lower unit commanders. A Geojin is a medium-size local administrative unit near the coasts commanded by a Cheomjeoljesa, a county commander between the provincial capital and small local towns near the coasts called Jejins, who are commanded by the chief local magistrates or a Manho, a naval commander. Using this strategic composition, a Jingwan fights and defend their provinces, and every province has several independent Jingwans. Under this system, the roles of local commanders were to be stationed at their post, know the local topography inside and out, draft the operation plan, train local sailors and marines, and defend their defensive quarter by mobilizing their sailors and ships in the case of conflict. Originally, the naval forces were supposed to work at sea, but because of the management of the ships and the arduous training, King Seongjong installed coastal fortresses. However, when there's a massive invasion, there are not enough soldiers to defend their provinces as it was also a dispersed-force defense system. It requires the concentrated use of forced local forces to defend their defense perimeters, and the Bupiljeoktajinjijobeob rule prevents provinces from coming to each other's aid. They requested military commanders from the central government for support who did not know a familiar province's terrain.

Sogo System
Seonjo established the Sogo System in 1593, a militia system during the Imjin war based on the Ming Chinese militia system and military texts. During the reign of King Sukjong, he implemented the Sogo system to strengthen the naval forces. He reduced the service period by dividing 6-months of service into three shifts from the previous two shifts and allowing officers to alternate their duties.

Naval Offices

Tongjeongyeong
In 1593, during the Imjin War, the Tongjeongyeong was a naval office that commanded the naval forces in Gyeongsang, Jeolla, and Chungcheong to strengthen the defense of the southern coast.

Tongeoyeong
In 1627 (the 5th year of King Injo), when facing a state of war, the Tongeoyeong was placed in Ganghwa to lead the naval forces in Gyeonggi and Yellow Seas to defend the capital area to administer naval joint-training camps (Hapjo) which is supervised by each provincial monk (suba,. The naval drills (dosujo, required sailors and marines under training officers to conduct naval training necessary for naval battles. They trained to sail ships in the spring tides held in February and autumn tides in August.

Ranks
In the early days of the Joseon Dynasty, the officers of the navy consisted of an admiral and naval commanders in each maritime camp. A ship's crew comprises rowers, gunners, marines, low-ranking officers, lieutenants, and a captain.

Ships

These ships are made of two types of wood: pine (later timber) for the hull and oak for the pegs and masts. They each had two masts and sails and were propelled by 8 to 10 oars on each side for maneuvering and increased speed. The ships had two to three levels stacked up on top of each other with u-shaped hulls that could turn them on their radius to fire on all four sides. Their flat keel enables a ship to sit comfortably on the tideland when the tide is out, after coming ashore, or inside a pier in high water. It also ensured greater mobility and a shallow draft and, in particular, allowed a ship to make sharp changes of direction at short notice. They also used smaller ships and boats for reconnaissance, skirmishes, transport, and fireships. These ships were meant to keep the Wako Pirates and the Japanese at bay and became a powerful force during the Joseon Dynasty.

Early Dynasty

Byeongjoseon
The byeongjoseon was a warship developed during King Sejo's era during peacetime. It was a very traditional ship developed to emphasize the standard use of warships for maintaining peace on the coasts when the navy became useless after the end of King Sejong. The Byeongjoseon developed into three sizes, the daebyeongjoseon, jungbyeongjoseon, and sobyeongjoseon. The daebyeongjoseon carries 50-60 sailors and 800lbs of grain. The jungbyeongjoseon carried 50 men, and the sobyeongjoseon carried 30 men. These ships fell into disuse as the navy developed more efficient warships.

Maengseon
The Maengseon was a warship succeeding the Byeongjoseon, serving from the time of King Seongjong to King Myeongjong. It has an appropriate number of oars installed on both sides as a place to row, and a deck is laid for soldiers to ride and engage in battle. The Maengseon came in three sizes, the Daemaengseon, Jungmaengseon, and Somaengseon deployed to naval bases. The Daemaengseon was large enough to accommodate 80 sailors, and when used as a merchant ship, it could carry 800lbs of grain. However, the Maengseon became useless and failed to fulfill its role as a warship.

Byeolseon
The Byeolseon was a warship to suppress the Wokou Piracy. They consist of daebyeolseon, jangbyeolseon, and sobyeolseon, and the average number of sailors on board is around 30. The Chuwabyeolmengseon and Chuwabyeolmengseon are special Byeolseon that chase the Wako, but their functions have not been revealed. However, it is believed that one of them may be a special ship like the turtle ship. Another type of Byeolseon is called the Waebyeolseon, but this is not a captured Wako ship; it is made like a Japanese pirate ship for naval practice.

Late Dynasty

Panokseon
A multideck warship that carries at least 26 cannons but usually carries more (maybe up to 50) and 50 to 60 rowers and sailors and another 125 marines. By having multiple levels, the rowers at the bottom were relatively safe, and marines at the top would have a height advantage over the enemy, firing down upon them and avoiding boarding the ship. The upper deck had a tower in the ship's middle used for command and observation. The deck of the panokseon was broad and flat, making it ideal for the installation of cannons.

Bangpaeseon
The shield ship (Bangpaeseon,, which is also called (Bangseon), was a medium-sized warship that carried 55 crewmen (mostly gunners) and protected them from enemy arrows and musket fire with a total of 31 pavisades of an appropriate height on both sides of the ship above the upper deck. It can operate near shallow west coasts where large ships have difficulty operating. In 1555, the ship launched into service, but it was not very important as it did not see action during the Imjin War and the Manchu Invasions until King Sukjong. The number of shields increased as time passed. In 1770, the number of shields was 97, more than 83 shields on large warships.

Turtle Ship
A pre-industrial assault ship clad in spike protruding hexagonal armored plates on the roof and designed for usually ramming enemy ships while firing at point-blank. Its crew complement usually comprised about 50 to 60 fighting marines and 70 rowers. The turtle ship carries 11 cannons on each side. There were two more cannon portholes on the front and back of the turtle ship. On the ship's top at the bow was a dragon's head used as an early form of psychological warfare. It's used as a projector that could generate and release sulfur to obscure vision and interfere with the enemy ships to maneuver and coordinate properly. It was also used as a third cannon port that could fit a cannon in the mouth of the dragon to be fired at enemy ships. The heavy cannons enabled the turtle ships to unleash a mass volley.

Other Ships

 are sailing boats for fishing.
 A barge-like ship that's small and fast to transport supplies to large ships and capture the retreating Japanese. It almost completely disappeared after the Imjin War.
 A small warship that escorts large and medium-sized warships and serves as an auxiliary ship transporting supplies and marines.
 evolved from the Goryeo-era .
 an auxiliary boat attached to a large warship. In the early days of the Imjin War, its role was primarily reconnaissance. Then it shifted to communication with land, transporting materials to a ship under construction, and civilians.
 a large warship with a pavilion.
 a scout ship that sailed ahead of the fleet observe the enemy's movements, and when they found an enemy ship, it notifies the fleet.

Equipment

Uniforms
Sailors and military officials wear military uniforms (kunbok). The oarsmen, gunners, archers, marines wore black military robes (hyeopsu) with white trimes. But the gunners, archers, and marines on deck wore light blue long sleeveless vests (jeonbok). Red vests representing master-at-arms and yellow vests for military bands. Commissioned officers (usually military yangban) wore a red and yellow military officials coat (dongdari) for middle to high-ranking officers and red and blue dongdari for junior-ranking officers with a black jeonbok and a military belt (jeondae). During emergencies and wartime, officers, the naval officers and marines wore war clothing (yungbok) with a (cheolrik) distinguishing rank by color. Red yungbok with a blue military belt represents high-ranking officers. Blue yungbok with a red military belt represents mid-ranking officers. Black yungbok with a black military belt represents junior ranking officers and elite soldiers and cavalry. High and middle-ranking officers wore hats called jeonrip. Sailors and officers of low-rank wore hats called beonggeoji or jukeon.

Armor
The sailors wore no armor or helmets. However, the Joseon military policy required sailors and marines to provide their armor. Padded armor (eomshimgap), and padded helmet (eomshimju), made from cotton layers, iron plates, and (or) leather was popular among archers and gunners as they offered body protection at lower prices. Sets of leather armor worn by sailors are called Pigabju. Senior naval officers and marines wore a traditional form of Korean armor that persisted with the Mongols' influences during the 13~14th centuries, lamellar armor (jalgap). It was a complete metallic armor set. It was composed of a helmet resembling European kettle hats with attached neck defenses of mail or lamellar, body armor reaching down to the thighs or knees, and a set of shoulder guards that protected the upper arm.

In the late dynasty, the dujeonggap is the Korean equivalent of brigandine. The high-ranking officers wore brass scales, and middle-low-ranking officers wore iron. The marines all wore brigandine made from cotton layers, and the plates weaved into the brigandine were either iron, copper, or leather. It became the primary form of Korean armor and often reached below the knees when worn. The helmet assumes a conical shape and has three brigandine flaps that protect the sides and back of the head.

Melee Weapons
The standard Korean sword was the hwando, a short and light curved sword commonly used by Joseon marines during peacetime. The standard Korean spear was the dangpa, a 7–8 ft three-pronged trident with a spear tip in the middle used for close defensive combat to trap an enemy's sword between two of the three prongs. Another polearm used in the navy was the jangchang, a four-meter spear wielded for thrusting and drawing while moving forward and backward. But due to its long length, they cannot use this spear for throwing. The woldo was a 9 ft curved-bladed polearm with a spike at the end of the handle and a tassel or feather attached to the blade. They also carry a pengbae, a round shield, or a deungpaea, a rattan shield along with a sword.

Projectile Weapons

Archery

Archers also used the pyeonjeon, a short arrow, and the tongah to help guide it as part of the standard kit of Chosun era archers. They can fire at an extended range of 350 meters and flatter trajectories with a faster velocity and penetrating power than regular arrows. Their quivers held 20 arrows and 10 pyeonjeon arrows. They also used repeating crossbows and crossbows.

Gunpowder
In 1395, several weapons were in use: a series of cannons called the daejanggunpo, ijanggunpo, and samjanggunpo, a shell-firing mortar called the jillyeopo, series of yuhwa, juhwa, and chokcheonhwa rockets, which were the forerunners of the singijeon, and a signal gun called the shinpo. These cannons improved during Taejong's rule. Among the people responsible for the developments was Choe Hae-san, son of Choe Mu-seon. 

The Koreans use the hwacha – multiple rocket-propelled arrows. The hwacha consisted of a two-wheeled cart carrying a board filled with holes into which the singijeon were inserted. It could fire up to 200 singijeon, a type of rocket arrow, all at once. The hwacha also has a variant called the munjong hwacha; it can fire 100 rocket arrows or 200 small Chongtong bullets at one time with changeable modules. The navy used them on panokseons under Admiral Yi Sun-sin to attack Japanese ships from a distance.

The cheon "heaven" or "sky," Ji "earth," Hyeon "black," and Hwang "yellow" or "gold" names are not significant, being the first four characters of the Thousand Character Classic. His son, Sejong, also made many improvements and increased the ranges of these cannons (called hwapo and later hwatong "fire tube" and chongtong "gun tube"). The seungja "victory gun," was a chongtong that serves as a standard Korean gun. A handheld shotgun-like cannon was attached to a staff that fired a large arrow, a bullet, and 15 small pellets by lighting a fuse. The gunners also used the seungja chongtong as a two-handed club in melee combat. Another variant was the soseungja chongtong, a handheld cannon attached to a gunstock that fired a bullet and a large arrow, but like the seungja it can only fire by lighting the fuse. In 1596, the seungja were phased out in favor of Japanese-style muskets and arquebuses. The Koreans called these jochong (조총/鳥銃). In the early 1500s, the bullanggi (불랑기/佛狼機), a breech-loading swivel gun, was introduced to Korea from Portugal via China. It was divided into sizes 1 through 5, in decreasing size. The small but powerful cannons of this era saw extensive use during the Japanese invasions of Korea (1592–98) by both the Joseon Navy and the army. Mortars used at this time were the chongtong-wan'gue, byeoldae-wan'gu, dae-wan'gu, jung-wan'gu, and so-wan'gu. These fired stones or the bigeukjincheonre a timed explosive shell. They were very effective against the weaker-built Japanese ships. The Nanjung ilgi says that many captured and used by the Japanese realized their full potential. The Hong'ipo was a cannon introduced from the Netherlands by Hendrick Hamel and others in the 1650s. Joseon also used this cannon during the 1866 French campaign against Korea, the 1871 United States expedition to Korea and the Ganghwa Island incident of September 20, 1875.

Strategy and Tactics
During the Imjin War, Admiral Yi Sun-sin disrupts Japanese supply lines and engage their fleets at strategic locations of his choosing such as straits with small islands and used currents to cripple them. He utilized range and artillery to keep the Japanese from boarding their ships and engaging in Hand-to-hand combat. Throughout his campaign, he used ambush tactics to demoralize them. He used three naval battle formations, "crane-wing formation" (Hakik-jin,, "long snake" formation (Jangsajin,, and the Hoengyeoljin. To support his formations, he used broadsides and plunging fire to sink the enemy ships. 

Yi Sun-Shin's objective was to sink the enemy ships through plunging fire through heavy artillery fire and fire arrows. At the Battle of Okpo, Yi sun-shin fired a broadside to prevent the Japanese from escaping the village. He recorded that "30 enemy ships burnt down to cover the sky with smoke", and in the Battle of Noryang, a record stated, "approximately 200 enemy ships burned with many killed and captured." He used this tactic for seven years on record.

Yi Sun-shin's ambush tactic was to strike the Japanese leader to demoralize their fleet preemptively. In the Battle of Dangpo, he ordered the turtle ship to penetrate the enemy fleet by spearheading the attack on the enemy flagship while decimating the surrounding fleet. Japanese admiral Kurujima Michiyuki was struck by the ship's arrow and fell into the sea. In the Battle of Busan and Myeongnyang, the Joseon fleet focused their firepower on the enemy's flagships and destroyed them. They also hanged their commander's head for his fleet to see like the Daimyo Kurushima Michifusa's at the top of the mast. A Japanese fleet followed their admiral, but without its admiral was a specific target for the Joseon fleet to destroy their enemies when they were confused.

Partisan tactics (Dangpa, were shock tactics to break the enemy. In the Battle of Sacheon, the turtle ship penetrates the enemy fleet while the panokseon supports them with suppressive fire to whither them down. Yi Soon-shin recorded at Dangpo, "The turtle ship came close to the enemy flagship, raised its dragon head, and fired the Hyeonja cannon. Let's hit the enemy ships and break them." Distance and range also became a partisan tactic at the Battle of Busan. Their goal was to destroy the enemy ships rather than kill them, resulting in the sinking of more than 100 enemy ships. Yi Soon-shin utilized this strategy based on the accurate perception of the capability of both sides to gain their victories.

The long-snake formation consists of many ships in a battle line. There were two types of long-snake formations. A long-snake assault formation, where after the turtle ship deploys a Dangpa strategy, a line of panokseons follows behind it at Sacheon. In 1592, Yi Sun-sin assembled the Joseon fleet in Busan and ordered the fleet in a long-snake formation to sink and damage the Japanese fleet docked there while sailing in a circle for a continuous volley.

The crane-wing formation comprises large warships in the center and the reserve with flagship and lighter ships and turtle ships on their wings to surround the enemy fleet. During the Battle of Hansando, Yi Sun-Shin dispatched a small detachment forward to lure the Japanese fleet, and they took the bait, following them into open waters off Hansan Island. He ordered his fleet to surround the Japanese fleet with the cran-wing formation and bombarded the Japanese for the whole day.

The chum formation (chumjajin) is a formation based on a Hanja character that means "sharp." It transitions into a crane-wing formation in two lines where it fires in a continuous volley through rank-fire. A line of ships rotates and fires, and then the following line moves up and does the same.

See also
Joseon Dynasty
Joseon naval campaigns of 1592
List of naval battles during the Japanese invasions of Korea (1592–1598)
Yi Sun-sin
Won Gyun
Turtle Ship

Joseon Army

References

Sources
 Stephen Turnbull, "Samurai Invasion - Japan's Korean War 1592-1598", Cassel & Co, 2002

External links
 Yi Sun-sin - EnCyber (in Korean)

Naval history of Korea
Joseon dynasty